Tetraplodon may refer to:
 Tetraplodon (bivalve), a genus of bivalves in the family Hyriidae
 Tetraplodon (plant), a genus of mosses in the family Splachnaceae